This is a list of the main tekkes in Albania. The tekkes belong to various Sufi orders, including the Bektashi and Rüfai Orders.

Tekkes

The Albanian Communist regime destroyed 530 tekkes, tombs and mausoleums.

See also 
List of Bektashi tekkes and shrines
List of Religious Cultural Monuments of Albania
Islam in Albania
Bektashi Order

References 

 
Tekkes